is the 18th single by Japanese singer Yōko Oginome, released on June 7, 1989 by Victor Entertainment. Written by Masao Urino and Yūji Ōtaguro, it is a cover of Chika Takeuchi's 1988 single "No, No, No" with different lyrics.

Background and release
Chika Takeuchi's "No, No, No", originally written by Reiko Yukawa and Yūji Ōtaguro, won the Japanese Grand Prix at the 18th World Popular Song Festival in 1987. The song was given new lyrics by Masao Urino as "Shōnan Heartbreak", which references the Sagami Bay region of Shōnan and is the lyrical sequel to Oginome's 1987 single "Wangan Taiyōzoku".

"Shōnan Heartbreak" peaked at No. 7 on Oricon's singles chart and sold over 72,000 copies. The song earned Oginome the 8th Pops Award at the Megalopolis Song Festival.

The song was performed with different lyrics on the TBS variety show Kato-chan Ken-chan Gokigen TV.

Track listing

Charts

References

External links

1989 singles
Yōko Oginome songs
Japanese-language songs
Songs with lyrics by Masao Urino
Victor Entertainment singles